Crazy Nights is the second studio album by country music band Lonestar. Four singles were released from this album: "Come Cryin' to Me", "You Walked In", "Say When", and "Everything's Changed". "Come Cryin' to Me" reached number one on the Hot Country Songs charts. Also included is a cover of country rock band Pure Prairie League's single "Amie".

"Come Cryin' to Me" and "Say When" were both co-written by John Rich, who also sang lead on "John Doe on a John Deere" and "What Do We Do with the Rest of the Night". All the other tracks feature Richie McDonald on lead vocals. This was Lonestar's last album to have a neotraditional country sound before developing a more crossover-friendly country-pop sound. This was also Lonestar's last album as a five-piece, as Rich left the band the following year when things were going down the wrong path. Rich's departure left McDonald as the group's sole lead vocalist because the record label said they wanted McDonald to be lead vocals only. After departing the group, he began a solo career on BNA, and eventually joined Big Kenny in the duo Big & Rich.

"Cheater's Road" was later recorded by Chalee Tennison on her 2003 album Parading in the Rain.

Critical reception
Thom Owens of Allmusic rated the album three stars out of five, saying that the singles and the "Amie" cover were "solid", but criticizing the other tracks for being "bland".

Track listing

Personnel 
Taken from liner notes.

Lonestar 
 Richie McDonald – lead vocals (1-4, 6-10), backing vocals (5, 11)
 Dean Sams – acoustic piano, backing vocals
 Michael Britt – electric lead guitar, acoustic guitar, backing vocals
 John Rich – bass guitar, backing vocals, lead vocals (5, 11)
 Keech Rainwater – drums, percussion

Additional musicians 
 Dennis Burnside – acoustic piano, keyboards, Hammond B3 organ
 John Barlow Jarvis – acoustic piano, Hammond B3 organ
 Brent Mason – electric guitars, gut string guitar
 Mark Casstevens – acoustic guitar, mandolin
 Bruce Bouton – dobro, pedal steel guitar, lap steel guitar
 David Hungate – bass guitar
 Duncan Mullins – bass guitar
 Lonnie Wilson – drums, percussion
 Tom Roady – percussion
 Stuart Duncan – fiddle
 Larry Franklin – fiddle
 Rob Hajacos – fiddle, assorted hoedown tools
 John Wesley Ryles – backing vocals
 Harry Stinson – backing vocals
 Dennis Wilson – backing vocals

Production 
 Don Cook – producer
 Wally Wilson – producer 
 Mike Bradley – recording, mixing 
 Mark Capps – recording assistant, mix assistant, additional recording 
 Pat McMakin – additional recording
 John Dickson – additional assistant engineer 
 Bart Pursley – additional assistant engineer 
 Adam Shepard – additional assistant engineer 
 Hank Williams – mastering at MasterMix (Nashville, Tennessee)
 Scott Johnson – production assistant 
 Susan Eaddy – art direction 
 Debendra Mahalanobis – design 
 Peter Nash – photography

Chart performance

Certifications

References

1997 albums
BNA Records albums
Lonestar albums
Albums produced by Don Cook
Albums produced by Wally Wilson